Aimee Chan (born 1 April 1981) or Chan Yan-mei (Traditional Chinese: 陳茵媺) is a Canadian born actress based in Hong Kong. She was the winner of Miss Hong Kong 2006 and was offered a TVB contract shortly after.

Biography
Aimee was born in Toronto, Ontario, Canada. Her parents were immigrants from Hong Kong. She began her modeling career at the age of 16. She attended Woodbridge College in Woodbridge, Ontario. After high school, Aimee studied at the Ontario College of Art & Design. She graduated at the age of 23 and became a Graphic Designer. One year later, she entered a modelling competition and won the title. Later she competed in her first beauty pageant. Shortly thereafter, she moved to Hong Kong in 2005.

She married Moses Chan in June 2013. The couple have three children: sons Aiden Joshua Chan (born 4 December 2013) and Nathan Lucas Chan (born 26 February 2015) and daughter Camilla Chan (born 27 April 2016).

Chan reportedly has left TVB after her contract ended two months ago, while she was still in hiatus to take care of her two sons. Sources claimed that Chan didn't make her departure known since husband Moses Chan is still working with TVB. Allegedly, Moses has been busy with dramas and show appearances as a way of paying his wife's debt to the company.

Pageant career

Miss Chinese Toronto 2004
Competing with 9 other delegates in the Miss Chinese Toronto Pageant 2004, she did not place in the top 3. The eventual winner of the pageant was Lena Ma.  She later started to host Toronto's What's On TV show at Fairchild.

Miss Hong Kong 2006
After losing in the Miss Chinese Toronto pageant, she competed in the Miss Hong Kong Pageant in 2006.  Though coming from Toronto, she went back to Hong Kong to compete. She made the top 21 of the Hong Kong group. After going into camp for 5 days training in Group C, she made the top 16. After filming with Seven in Korea, she competed on 12 August 2006 for the title. Though being a favorite, there were negative reports circulating about plastic surgery. Despite this she won the crown, audience favourite and won the Miss International Goodwill title as well.

Miss World 2006
As the Miss World Organization no longer accepts runners-up as contestants in the Miss World pageant, Aimee was asked to compete in the Miss World 2006 pageant in Warsaw, Poland. However Aimee did not compete in Miss World 2006 due to being overage, first runner-up Janet Chow replaced her.

Miss Chinese International 2007
In January 2007, Aimee competed in the Miss Chinese International 2007 pageant, representing Hong Kong. She was a favorite to win the title and was expected to at least make the top 5. However, due to an average performance in the interview stages, she placed in the top 10 only. Aimee became the fifth Miss Hong Kong to not place in the top 5, after Winnie Yeung in 1996 and her predecessor, (Hoyan Mok) 1994, Kate Tsui in 2005, and Tracy Ip in 2006. The pageant was eventually won by Sarah Song of Sydney.

After Miss Hong Kong
Upon winning Miss Hong Kong, Aimee was signed by TVB and began a career in television, initially starting in MC duties at large charity shows, award shows and other live broadcasts. In 2007 Aimee was featured in TVB's Children's Music Awards. Upon passing her crown, Aimee reaffirmed her interest in design - stating that she intends to work on her own brand in the future. She starred in the highly acclaimed TV drama series: Best Selling Secrets. She earned a best supporting actress nomination and won most improved actress for her work in Burning Flame III, Off Pedder and E.U. She also starred in Every Move You Make alongside Bowie Lam and Bosco Wong.

Filmography

TV dramas

Film

References

External links
Official TVB blog 

|-
! colspan="3" style="background: #DAA520;" | TVB Anniversary Awards
|-

1981 births
Living people
21st-century Canadian actresses
Actresses from Toronto
Canadian expatriates in Hong Kong
Canadian film actresses
Canadian graphic designers
Canadian people of Hong Kong descent
Canadian television actresses
Miss Hong Kong winners
OCAD University alumni
TVB actors
Women graphic designers
Canadian-born Hong Kong artists